Fabio Sole (born 15 September 2001) is an English professional footballer who plays as a midfielder for Hartley Wintney on dual registration with National League South club Slough Town.

Career
On 4 September 2019, Sole joined Oxford United, having been released by Reading. Sole made his debut for Oxford on 8 October 2019 in a 2–2 draw at home to Portsmouth in the EFL Trophy. Sole converted Oxford's first penalty of the resulting penalty shootout, but Oxford went on to lose the shootout 5–4.

On 13 February 2020, Sole joined Southern League Premier Division Central side AFC Rushden & Diamonds on a one-month loan deal. He had a spell on loan at Farnborough in 2020.

He was released by Oxford at the end of the 2020–21 season.

Having spent the vast majority of the 2021–22 season out injured, Sole signed for National League South club Slough Town in July 2022 following a successful trial period. In October 2022, Sole joined Hartley Wintney on dual registration.

Career statistics

References

External links
 
 

Living people
2001 births
English footballers
Association football midfielders
Oxford United F.C. players
AFC Rushden & Diamonds players
Farnborough F.C. players
Slough Town F.C. players
Hartley Wintney F.C. players
Southern Football League players
National League (English football) players